Christopher James Lester (born 27 October 1994) is a Northern Irish professional footballer who last played for Bolton Wanderers in the Championship as a midfielder.

Club career
A youth product of the club's academy since he joined at under-14s level, Lester signed his first professional contract with the club after a good display throughout the club's academy for U18 and U21.

Lester first appeared as an unused substitute for Bolton Wanderers in a 2–2 FA Cup draw against Sunderland. Again, he was an unused substitute in a league match against Middlesbrough. A lack of first team opportunities saw him being loaned to Chester in 2013, on a one-month loan along with teammate Conor Wilkinson. He was also nominated for the Rising Star award in September 2013.

On 22 April 2014, Lester made his first team debut for Bolton, coming as a 77th-minute substitute for Chung-Yong Lee against Leicester City.

On 25 March 2015 it was announced that Lester had joined Hartlepool United on trial, scoring on his debut for the reserves.

On 15 May 2015 Chris Lester was released by Bolton along with 12 other players.

International career
In May 2013, Lester was first called up by Northern Ireland U21 after being eligible to play for them through his grandfather. Lester made his Northern Ireland U21 debut on 30 May 2013, in a 3-0 loss against Cyprus U21.

References

External links

1994 births
Living people
Association football midfielders
People from Salford
English people of Northern Ireland descent
Bolton Wanderers F.C. players
Chester F.C. players
Warrington Town F.C. players
English Football League players
Northern Ireland under-21 international footballers
Association footballers from Northern Ireland